Ealing Cricket Club is a cricket club in Ealing, London (formerly Middlesex).

The club was formed in 1870, and have played their home games at Ealing Cricket Club Ground since at least 1874.

The 1st XI play in the Middlesex County Cricket League Premier League, which they have won 11 times, most recently in 2017.
They have won the ECB National Club Twenty20 in 2011 and 2015.
They have also been runners-up in the ECB National Club Cricket Championship on 4 occasions.

The club currently fields 7 senior men's teams, 17 junior teams and a women's team which competes in the Middlesex Women's Cricket League.

References

External links
 Middlesex County Cricket League
 Ealing Cricket Club

English club cricket teams
Cricket in Middlesex
Cricket clubs established in 1871